Voyage was a French television channel devoted to discovery and escape through travel which had been owned by the Fox Networks Group since 2004.

The headquarters of Voyage occupies the former headquarters of La Cinq, at 241 Boulevard Pereire in the 17th arrondissement of Paris.

History
Voyage was launched on Canal Satellite on 31 May 1996. The channel was acquired in May 1997 by Pathé, which sold it in 2004 to Fox International Channels. Following Disney's takeover of Fox Networks Group, the channel ceased broadcasting on December 31, 2020.

References

External links
 

Defunct television channels in France
French-language television stations
Television channels and stations established in 1996
1996 establishments in France
Disney television networks
Television channels and stations disestablished in 2020
2020 disestablishments in France